was the founder of Tenshin Shōden Katori Shintō-ryū which is a traditional (koryū) Japanese martial art. His Buddhist posthumous name is Taiganin-den-Taira-no-Ason-Iga-no-Kami-Raiodo-Hon-Daikoji.

He was reputed to be a respected spearman and swordsman who served the Chiba family in what is today Chiba Prefecture. When his hometown was destroyed he began wandering the land until he settled down near the Katori Shrine and founded the Tenshin Shōden Katori Shintō-ryū in c.1447.

References
 De Lange, William (2006). Famous Japanese Swordsmen: The Warring States Period, Floating World Editions. 
 Otake, Risuke (1977). The Deity and the Sword - Katori Shinto-ryu, Vol 1, Japan, Japan Publications Trading Co.  (Original Japanese title for all three volumes in this series is Mukei Bunkazai Katori Shinto-ryu)
 Hall, David Avalon. Marishiten: Buddhism and the warrior Goddess, Ph.D. dissertation, Ann Arbor: University microfilms, p. 274-292 are about TSKSR
 Skoss, Diane (editor) (1999). Sword & Spirit, Classical Warrior Traditions of Japan, vol 2., p. 67-69
 Watatani, Kiyoshi (1967). Zusetsu Kobudōshi, Tokyo

Notes

Samurai
Martial arts school founders
Japanese centenarians
Men centenarians
1387 births
1488 deaths
People from Chiba Prefecture